The Centre Mersenne is a publishing center to help open-access mathematical journals. The Centre Mersenne is located in Grenoble, France. It operates in partnership with UGA Éditions. It is supported by CNRS and Université Grenoble Alpes (UGA), with a funding from the Grenoble IDEX. The Centre Mersenne is named after Marin Mersenne.

Some academic journals published by Centre Mersenne:
 Algebraic Combinatorics
 Annales Henri Lebesgue
 Annales de la faculté des sciences de Toulouse 
 Annales de l'Institut Fourier 
 Annales mathématiques Blaise Pascal 
 Confluentes Mathematici 
 Journal de l'École polytechnique — Mathématiques 
 Journal de théorie des nombres de Bordeaux 
 MathS In Action 
 Publications Mathématiques de Besançon - Algèbre et Théorie des Nombres 
 SMAI Journal of Computational Mathematics

References

External links
 

Publishing companies of France